Thespesia populnea, commonly known as the  portia tree, Pacific rosewood, Indian tulip tree, or milo, among other names, is a species of flowering plant belonging to the mallow family, Malvaceae. It is a tree found commonly on coasts around the world. Although it is confirmed to be native only to the Old World tropics, other authorities consider it to have a wider, possibly pantropical native distribution. It is thought to be an invasive species in Florida and Brazil.

Distribution 
Thespesia populnea is native to tropical coastlines and is adapted for oceanic dispersal and growth in island environments. It is known from both coasts of Africa, tropical Asia, northern Australia, the Pacific Islands (including Hawaii), the tropical Pacific coast of the Americas from Mexico south to Colombia, the West Indies, and Florida in the United States. Its exact native distribution has been debated, with most authorities considering it to only be native to the Old World tropics, some others such as Plants of the World Online including the Pacific Islands in its native range, and others such as the IUCN Red List and the USDA also including the tropical Americas within its native range. The IUCN only considers T. populnea to be introduced and invasive in Florida. It may also be invasive in northern Brazil.

Like the related Hibiscus tiliaceus, it was one of the main sources of bast fibers for the production of cordage and wood for Austronesian outrigger ships and carving. Though the plant seeds can survive for months on sea currents, no remains of T. populnea have been recovered from Polynesia prior to the Austronesian expansion (c. 5,000 BP), thus it is regarded by some authors as a canoe plant, deliberately carried and introduced by Austronesian voyagers in the islands they settled. However, it is still considered questionably indigenous to the Pacific islands, including Hawaii, by many other authorities. In Hawaii, it is classified as a native species and is used in habitat restoration projects for the degraded Hawaiian tropical dry forests alongside the definitively native tree species Dodonaea viscosa and Cordia subcordata.

Description

The Portia tree is able to grow in the wide range of soil types that may be present in coastal environments, including soils derived from quartz (sand), limestone, and basalt; it favours neutral soils (pH of 6–7.4). Pollen grains are approximately 70 microns in diameter.

Uses
The heartwood of the Portia tree is dark reddish brown to chocolate brown and has a specific gravity of 0.55 to 0.89.

Portia tree is known as milo or miro in Polynesian languages. It is popular in Hawaii for woodworking (commonly turned into bowls) because of the range of colours expressed (tan, through yellow, to red). The trees were regarded as sacred in Polynesian culture, and were commonly planted in marae sites along with trees like Ficus, Fagraea berteroana, Casuarina equisetifolia and Calophyllum inophyllum. Traditionally it was planted in sacred groves and used for religious sculpture throughout eastern Polynesia. In Tahiti, Milo wood is used in the making of the to'ere (slotted wooden drum), used in traditional Tahitian tribal drumming. Makoi was used for the rongorongo tablets of Easter Island. Since the advent of aluminium-hulled boats in the 20th century, Pitcairners have made regular trips to  Henderson Island to harvest miro wood. Usually they venture to Henderson only once per year, but may make up to three trips if the weather is favourable. Pitcairners carve the wood into curios, from which they derive much of their income.

In New Ireland, Portia wood is used to make hourglass drums. In Tonga, its bark is used to treat mouth infections among infants, and its wood is used to make canoes, house parts, and artwork.

In South Asia, it is used to make the thavil, a Carnatic musical instrument of South India. The flower of the Portia tree played a part in Sri Lanka's independence movement, when it was sold on Remembrance Day by the Suriya-Mal Movement instead of the poppy to aid Sri Lankan ex-servicemen. The wood from the tree was used by early Tamil people to make instruments in ancient Tamilakam. It can be used for the cellulose production from the plants [Singh et al 2019].

In some parts of the world, such as Hawaii and southern India, T. populnea is considered an important species in habitat restoration projects for coastal dry forests.

See also
 Domesticated plants and animals of Austronesia

References

Further reading

External links

 
 
Images on Wikipedia commons

populnea
Plants described in 1807
Flora of Africa
Flora of temperate Asia
Flora of tropical Asia
Flora of Australia
Flora of Mexico
Flora of the Pacific
Flora of South America
Pantropical flora
Flora without expected TNC conservation status